This is a list of airlines currently operating in the Gambia.

See also

List of defunct airlines of Gambia
List of airlines of Africa
 List of companies based in The Gambia

References

Airlines

Gambia
Airlines
Gambia